In continuum mechanics, the finite strain theory—also called large strain theory, or large deformation theory—deals with deformations in which strains and/or rotations are large enough to invalidate assumptions inherent in infinitesimal strain theory.  In this case, the undeformed and deformed configurations of the continuum are significantly different, requiring a clear distinction between them. This is commonly the case with elastomers, plastically-deforming materials and other fluids and biological soft tissue.

Displacement

The displacement of a body has two components: a rigid-body displacement and a deformation.
 A rigid-body displacement consists of a simultaneous translation and rotation of the body without changing its shape or size.
 Deformation implies the change in shape and/or size of the body from an initial or undeformed configuration  to a current or deformed configuration  (Figure 1).

A change in the configuration of a continuum body can be described by a displacement field. A displacement field is a vector field of all displacement vectors for all particles in the body, which relates the deformed configuration with the undeformed configuration. The distance between any two particles changes if and only if deformation has occurred. If displacement occurs without deformation, then it is a rigid-body displacement.

Material coordinates (Lagrangian description)
The displacement of particles indexed by variable  may be expressed as follows. The vector joining the positions of a particle in the undeformed configuration  and deformed configuration  is called the displacement vector.

where  are the orthonormal unit vectors that define the basis of the spatial (lab-frame) coordinate system.

where  is the displacement vector representing rigid-body translation.

The partial derivative of the displacement vector with respect to the material coordinates yields the material displacement gradient tensor . Thus we have,

where  is the deformation gradient tensor.

Spatial coordinates (Eulerian description)
In the Eulerian description, the vector extending from a particle  in the undeformed configuration to its location in the deformed configuration is called the displacement vector:

where  are the unit vectors that define the basis of the material (body-frame) coordinate system.

The partial derivative of the displacement vector with respect to the spatial coordinates yields the spatial displacement gradient tensor . Thus we have,

Relationship between the material and spatial coordinate systems
Thus

Knowing that

then

Combining the coordinate systems of deformed and undeformed configurations

Thus in material (undeformed) coordinates, the displacement may be expressed as:

And in spatial (deformed) coordinates, the displacement may be expressed as:

Deformation gradient tensor

Then, by the implicit function theorem, the Jacobian determinant  must be nonsingular, i.e. 

The material deformation gradient tensor  is a second-order tensor that represents the gradient of the mapping function or functional relation , which describes the motion of a continuum. Thus we have,

Relative displacement vector
Consider a particle or material point  with position vector  in the undeformed configuration (Figure 2). The coordinate systems for the undeformed and deformed configuration can be superimposed for convenience.

Consider now a material point  neighboring , with position vector . In the deformed configuration this particle has a new position  given by the position vector . Thus from Figure 2 we have

Taylor approximation
For an infinitesimal element , and assuming continuity on the displacement field, it is possible to use a Taylor series expansion around point , neglecting higher-order terms, to approximate the components of the relative displacement vector for the neighboring particle  as

Thus, the previous equation  can be written as

Time-derivative of the deformation gradient
Calculations that involve the time-dependent deformation of a body often require a time derivative of the deformation gradient to be calculated.  A geometrically consistent definition of such a derivative requires an excursion into differential geometry but we avoid those issues in this article.

where  is the (material) velocity.  The derivative on the right hand side represents a material velocity gradient. It is common to convert that into a spatial gradient by applying the chain rule for derivatives, i.e.,

If the spatial velocity gradient is constant in time, the above equation can be solved exactly to give

There are several methods of computing the exponential above.

Related quantities often used in continuum mechanics are the rate of deformation tensor and the spin tensor defined, respectively, as:

The rate of deformation tensor gives the rate of stretching of line elements while the spin tensor indicates the rate of rotation or vorticity of the motion.

The material time derivative of the inverse of the deformation gradient (keeping the reference configuration fixed) is often required in analyses that involve finite strains.  This derivative is

Transformation of a surface and volume element

The corresponding formula for the transformation of the volume element is

Polar decomposition of the deformation gradient tensor

, followed by a rotation , i.e., ; or equivalently, by applying a rigid rotation  first, i.e., followed later by a stretching , i.e.,  (See Figure 3).

Due to the orthogonality of 

The principal directions are related by

Deformation tensors

Several rotation-independent deformation tensors are used in mechanics.  In solid mechanics, the most popular of these are the right and left Cauchy–Green deformation tensors.

Since a pure rotation should not induce any strains in a deformable body, it is often convenient to use rotation-independent measures of deformation in continuum mechanics. As a rotation followed by its inverse rotation leads to no change we can exclude the rotation by multiplying  by its transpose.

The right Cauchy–Green deformation tensor
In 1839, George Green introduced a deformation tensor known as the right Cauchy–Green deformation tensor or Green's deformation tensor, defined as:

Physically, the Cauchy–Green tensor gives us the square of local change in distances due to deformation, i.e. 

The most commonly used invariants are

The Finger deformation tensor
The IUPAC recommends that the inverse of the right Cauchy–Green deformation tensor (called the Cauchy tensor in that document), i. e., be called the Finger tensor.  However, that nomenclature is not universally accepted in applied mechanics.

The left Cauchy–Green or Finger deformation tensor
Reversing the order of multiplication in the formula for the right Green–Cauchy deformation tensor leads to the left Cauchy–Green deformation tensor which is defined as:

The left Cauchy–Green deformation tensor is often called the Finger deformation tensor, named after Josef Finger (1894).

The conventional invariants are defined as

where  is the determinant of the deformation gradient.

For compressible materials, a slightly different set of invariants is used:

The Cauchy deformation tensor
Earlier in 1828, Augustin-Louis Cauchy introduced a deformation tensor defined as the inverse of the left Cauchy–Green deformation tensor, .  This tensor has also been called the Piola tensor and the Finger tensor in the rheology and fluid dynamics literature.

Spectral representation

Furthermore,

Observe that

Therefore, the uniqueness of the spectral decomposition also implies that .  The left stretch is also called the spatial stretch tensor while the right stretch is called the material stretch tensor.

In a similar vein,

Examples
 Uniaxial extension of an incompressible material
Then:  
 Simple shear
  
 Rigid body rotation

Derivatives of stretch
Derivatives of the stretch with respect to the right Cauchy–Green deformation tensor are used to derive the stress-strain relations of many solids, particularly hyperelastic materials.  These derivatives are

and follow from the observations that

Physical interpretation of deformation tensors
Let  be a Cartesian coordinate system defined on the undeformed body and let  be another system defined on the deformed body. Let a curve  in the undeformed body be parametrized using .

The undeformed length of the curve is given by

After deformation, the length becomes

Note that the right Cauchy–Green deformation tensor is defined as

Hence,

Finite strain tensors
The concept of strain is used to evaluate how much a given displacement differs locally from a rigid body displacement. One of such strains for large deformations is the Lagrangian finite strain tensor, also called the Green-Lagrangian strain tensor or Green – St-Venant strain tensor, defined as

or as a function of the displacement gradient tensor

or

The Eulerian-Almansi finite strain tensor, referenced to the deformed configuration, i.e. Eulerian description, is defined as

or as a function of the displacement gradients we have

Seth–Hill family of generalized strain tensors
B. R. Seth from the Indian Institute of Technology Kharagpur was the first to show that the Green and Almansi strain tensors are special cases of a more general  strain measure. The idea was further expanded upon by Rodney Hill in 1968. The Seth–Hill family of strain measures (also called Doyle-Ericksen tensors) can be expressed as

For different values of  we have:
 Green-Lagrangian strain tensor 
 Biot strain tensor 
 Logarithmic strain, Natural strain, True strain, or Hencky strain 
 Almansi strain 
The second-order approximation of these tensors is

where  is the infinitesimal strain tensor.

Many other different definitions of tensors  are admissible, provided that they all satisfy the conditions that:
  vanishes for all rigid-body motions
 it is also desired that  reduces to the infinitesimal strain tensor  as the norm 

An example is the set of tensors

Stretch ratio
The stretch ratio is a measure of the extensional or normal strain of a differential line element, which can be defined at either the undeformed configuration or the deformed configuration.

The stretch ratio for the differential element  (Figure) in the direction of the unit vector  at the material point , in the undeformed configuration, is defined as

where  is the deformed magnitude of the differential element .

Similarly, the stretch ratio for the differential element  (Figure), in the direction of the unit vector  at the material point , in the deformed configuration, is defined as

The normal strain  in any direction  can be expressed as a function of the stretch ratio,

This equation implies that the normal strain is zero, i.e. no deformation, when the stretch is equal to unity. Some materials, such as elastometers can sustain stretch ratios of 3 or 4 before they fail, whereas traditional engineering materials, such as concrete or steel, fail at much lower stretch ratios, perhaps of the order of 1.1 (reference?)

Physical interpretation of the finite strain tensor
The diagonal components  of the Lagrangian finite strain tensor are related to the normal strain, e.g.

where  is the normal strain or engineering strain in the direction .

The off-diagonal components  of the Lagrangian finite strain tensor are related to shear strain, e.g.

Under certain circumstances, i.e. small displacements and small displacement rates, the components of the Lagrangian finite strain tensor may be approximated by the components of the infinitesimal strain tensor

Deformation tensors in convected curvilinear coordinates
A representation of deformation tensors in curvilinear coordinates is useful for many problems in continuum mechanics such as nonlinear shell theories and large plastic deformations. Let  denote the function by which a position vector in space is constructed from coordinates . The coordinates are said to be "convected" if they correspond to a one-to-one mapping to and from Lagrangian particles in a continuum body. If the coordinate grid is "painted" on the body in its initial configuration, then this grid will deform and flow with the motion of material to remain painted on the same material particles in the deformed configuration so that grid lines intersect at the same material particle in either configuration.

The three tangent vectors at  form a local basis.  These vectors are related the reciprocal basis vectors by

Let us define a second-order tensor field  (also called the metric tensor) with components

The Christoffel symbols of the first kind can be expressed as

To see how the Christoffel symbols are related to the Right Cauchy–Green deformation tensor let us similarly define two bases, the already mentioned one that is tangent to deformed grid lines and another that is tangent to the undeformed grid lines. Namely,

The deformation gradient in curvilinear coordinates
Using the definition of the gradient of a vector field in curvilinear coordinates, the deformation gradient can be written as

The right Cauchy–Green tensor in curvilinear coordinates
The right Cauchy–Green deformation tensor is given by

If we express  in terms of components with respect to the basis {} we have

Therefore,

and the corresponding Christoffel symbol of the first kind may be written in the following form.

Some relations between deformation measures and Christoffel symbols

Then,

Noting that

and  we have

Define

Hence

Define

Then

Define the Christoffel symbols of the second kind as

Then

Therefore,

The invertibility of the mapping implies that

Therefore,

Compatibility conditions

The problem of compatibility in continuum mechanics involves the determination of allowable single-valued continuous fields on bodies.  These allowable conditions leave the body without unphysical gaps or overlaps after a deformation.  Most such conditions apply to simply-connected bodies.  Additional conditions are required for the internal boundaries of multiply connected bodies.

Compatibility of the deformation gradient
The necessary and sufficient conditions for the existence of a compatible  field over a simply connected body are

Compatibility of the right Cauchy–Green deformation tensor
The necessary and sufficient conditions for the existence of a compatible  field over a simply connected body are

We can show these are the mixed components of the Riemann–Christoffel curvature tensor. Therefore, the necessary conditions for -compatibility are that the Riemann–Christoffel curvature of the deformation is zero.

Compatibility of the left Cauchy–Green deformation tensor
No general sufficiency conditions are known for the left Cauchy–Green deformation tensor in three-dimensions.  Compatibility conditions for two-dimensional  fields have been found by Janet Blume.

See also
 Infinitesimal strain
 Compatibility (mechanics)
 Curvilinear coordinates
 Piola–Kirchhoff stress tensor, the stress tensor for finite deformations.
 Stress measures
 Strain partitioning

References

Further reading

External links
Prof. Amit Acharya's notes on compatibility on iMechanica

Tensors
Continuum mechanics
Elasticity (physics)
Non-Newtonian fluids
Solid mechanics